The 146th Pennsylvania House of Representatives District is located in Southeastern Pennsylvania and has been represented since 2019 by Joe Ciresi.

District profile
The 146th Pennsylvania House of Representatives District is located in Montgomery County. It is made up of the following areas:
  
 Limerick Township
 Lower Pottsgrove Township
 Perkiomen Township
 Pottstown (PART, Districts 03, 04, 05, 06 and 07 [PART, Division 02])
 Royersford
 Trappe

Representatives

Recent election results

References

External links
District map from the United States Census Bureau
Pennsylvania House Legislative District Maps from the Pennsylvania Redistricting Commission.  
Population Data for District 146 from the Pennsylvania Redistricting Commission.

Government of Montgomery County, Pennsylvania
146